Boronia crassifolia is a plant in the citrus family, Rutaceae and is endemic to the south-west of Western Australia. It is a small, slender shrub with pinnate leaves, and yellowish green to brownish, four petalled flowers.

Description
It has pinnate leaves with three, five or seven linear to spatula-shaped leaflets . The eight stamens alternate in length with the four near the petals longer than those near the sepals.

Taxonomy and naming
Boronia crassifolia was first formally described in 1845 by Friedrich Gottlieb Bartling and the description was published in Plantae Preissianae. The specific epithet (crassifolia) is derived from the Latin words  crassus meaning "thick", "fat" or "stout" and folium meaning "a leaf".

Distribution and habitat
This boronia grows on sandplains and sand dunes, often among rocks near Mount Lesueur and from near Perth to the Stirling Range and east to the Twilight Cove, in the Avon Wheatbelt, Esperance Plains, Geraldton Sandplains, Hampton, Jarrah Forest and Mallee biogeographic regions.

References

crassifolia
Flora of Western Australia
Plants described in 1863
Taxa named by Friedrich Gottlieb Bartling